UMDL may refer to:

 University of Michigan Digital Library
 Unmapped drainage lines, devices for removing the water from swamps, e.g. prior to tree harvesting
 Unstructured minimum descriptive length